A high wheeler is a car which uses large diameter wheels that are similar to those used by horse-drawn vehicles. These cars were produced until about 1915, predominantly in the United States.

Design 
High wheelers were derived from horse-drawn wagons, and often were conversions of these. Similarly to these wagons, they often feature wood-spoke wheels, suspensions and boxy wooden bodies.

The large-diameter slender wheels were frequently with solid rubber tires, to provide ample ground clearance on the primitive roads of the late 19th century.

These cars were produced in many body styles. The most common were the motorized wagon (utility vehicle) runabout, roadster and buggy, some with detachable tonneaus.

History 
Before gasoline engines became widely available, high wheelers were powered by electric motors or steam engines.

The decline of the high wheeler began when standard automobiles became more sophisticated and inexpensive. The end came with the popularity of the Ford Model T. The last high wheelers were built around 1915.

Manufacturers 
The following companies produced high-wheeler cars:

ABC
Anchor Buggy
Åtvidabergs Vagnfabrik
Best 
Black
Buckeye
 
Clymer 
Cole*
Columbia Electric*
De Schaum
DeWitt
 
Duryea

Electrobat
Eureka
Fuller*
Hatfield
Haynes-Apperson*
Hobbie Accessible
Holsman
Holyoke
International Harvester*
Jeannin 
Jewell/Jewel*
Keystone
Kiblinger
King*
Lindsley
Luverne* 
McIntyre*

Reliable Dayton
Schacht*
Sears 
Single Center
Sperry Electric
Staver

Success
  
Waverley Electric* 
Woods*
*

* Companies which also produced cars other than high wheelers

References

Sources
Kimes, Beverly Rae and Clark Jr, Henry Austin.  Standard Catalog of American Cars: 1805-1942 (Third Edition). Iola, WI: Krause. 1996. 

Car body styles
Car classifications
Highwheeler
1890s cars
1900s cars
1910s cars
Veteran vehicles
Brass Era vehicles